Jacek Malczewski (15 July 1854 – 8 October 1929) was a Polish symbolist painter who is one of the most revered painters of Poland, associated with the patriotic Young Poland movement following a century of Partitions. He is regarded as the father of Polish Symbolism. His creative output combined the predominant style of his times with historical motifs of Polish martyrdom, the romantic ideals of independence, Christian and Greek mythology, folk tales, as well as his love of the natural world. He was the father of painter Rafał Malczewski.

Childhood
Malczewski was born in Radom, Congress Poland, under occupation of the Russian Empire. During his childhood and early youth he was greatly influenced by his father Julian, a Polish patriot and social activist who introduced him to the world of romantic literature inspired by the November Uprising. On his mother's side, he was related to the Szymanowski family whom they often visited on their Masovian country estate in Cygów. The attractiveness of the Polish landscape and associated folklore had been awakened in him by Feliks Karczewski, his uncle and long-time guardian, who had invited future novelist Adolf Dygasiński to his estate, to act as Jacek's home tutor.

Artistic career

Malczewski moved to Kraków at age 17, and began his artistic education in 1872 under the watchful eye of Polish painter and draughtsman  and attended his first art classes in the workshop of Władysław Łuszczkiewicz at the School of Fine Arts. A year later, in 1873, assessed by Jan Matejko himself, Malczewski formally enrolled at the School, and studied with Łuszczkiewicz, Feliks Szynalewski and Florian Cynk. In 1876 he went to Paris and studied for a year at the École des Beaux-Arts, in the studio of Henri Lehmann. He next moved to the Académie Suisse.

Malczewski had already begun master classes with Jan Matejko in 1875 before embarking on the trip to France, and completed them in 1879 after his return from abroad. In spite of considerable stylistic differences between them, Malczewski was greatly influenced by Matejko's historical painting filled with neo-romantic metaphor and patriotic themes. In 1879, Malczewski completed a course in composition under Matejko. He was equally impressed with the dramatic art of earlier Polish romantic painter Artur Grottger. His painting revolved around a few carefully selected motifs, constantly retold and expanded according to mythology and filled with national symbols. His own imagination enabled Malczewski to channel his creativity and let new aesthetic ideas emerge giving rise to what became Poland's school of Symbolism.

Inspiration
Over the course of some 30 years between 1885 and 1916, Malczewski regularly visited Paris, Munich and Vienna. He made several trips to Italy, Greece and Turkey. He also took part in an archaeological expedition organized by his friend Karol Lanckoroński. He drew his inspiration from a wide variety of sources often exotic or biblical, and translated them back into Polish folklore, tradition and motifs in his own painting. His most famous canvases include Błędne koło (Vicious Circle, 1895–97), Melancholia (1890–1894),  (Painter's Muse, 1897), Wizja (A vision, 1912), the Thanatos series, and Bajki (Fables). Many of his paintings prominently feature self-portraits in elaborate costume, a trademark of his style, often displaying a great sense of self-mocking humour.

In 1897–1900 and 1912–1921 Malczewski served as professor of the Academy of Fine Arts in Kraków. He was elected rector of the academy in 1912. His art has been compared to that of the Frenchman Gustave Moreau, the Swiss Arnold Böcklin, and even to the Spaniard Salvador Dalí. His paintings won numerous awards at international exhibitions including Berlin in 1891, Munich in 1892, and Paris in 1900.

Personal life
Malczewski was married to Maria née Garlewska and they had two children, Julia (born 1888) and Rafał (born 1892), also a painter. His son later sold off all of his father's works left to him, to the National Museum in Warsaw before World War II. During the war he left Poland and after travels in Southern Europe and Brazil, finally settled in Montreal.

It is believed that the subject of numerous nude studies in Jacek Malczewski's paintings, Maria Bal (Balowa) née Brunicka, was also his long-time lover. He lost his sight towards the end of his life and died in Kraków on October 8, 1929. He was buried at Skałka, Poland's national Panthéon.

Art market
In November 2022, Malczewski's 1908 oil-on-canvas painting entitled Rzeczywistość (Reality) was sold at DESA Unicum auction house in Warsaw for 17 million zlotys (€3.6 million) setting a new record for the most expensive painting sold on the Polish art market. The sale of the piece remains on hold after doubts were raised about the legal status of this property as the National Museum in Warsaw claims ownership of the work of art. The painting was last seen in public in 1926 in Lwów (now Lviv, Ukraine). Its later whereabouts were unknown. The Polish Ministry of Culture and National Heritage reported to the police authorities that the painting could have been illegally taken from Poland in the 1950s.

Selected works

See also

 Sukiennice Museum in  Kraków
 National Museum, Kraków
 Culture of Kraków
 City of Radom
 List of Polish painters
 List of Poles

Notes and references

External links
Paintings of Jacek Malczewski at Zascianek.pl
Virtual Art Nouveau museum - Jacek Malczewski at Muzeum Secesji.pl
Culture.pl

1854 births
1929 deaths
People from Radom
People from Radom Governorate
19th-century Polish painters
19th-century Polish male artists
Symbolist painters
20th-century Polish painters
20th-century Polish male artists
Commanders of the Order of Polonia Restituta
École des Beaux-Arts alumni
Academic staff of the Jan Matejko Academy of Fine Arts
Polish male painters